This article lists the presidents of the Cortes of Castile and León, the regional legislature of Castile and León.

Presidents

References

Castile and León